Brian Coogan is a keyboardist and vocalist from New Orleans, Louisiana.

A versatile musician, Coogan plays in many different contexts and projects, ranging from funk to jazz to rock, including many subgenres within.  He is often found as a sideman on gigs with other New Orleanians such as Johnny Vidacovich, Khris Royal, Mike Dillon, and Alex McMurray.  A long-time connection with drummer Simon Lott (both grew up in Baton Rouge, Louisiana) has led to many projects that include both of them, notably the now-defunct Maelstrom Trio, with Skerik.

In recent years he has toured nationally as a member of John Ellis & Double-Wide, Maelstrom Trio, Bonerama, Stanton Moore's Trio, and Bobby Previte's Coalition of the Willing.  He is a former member of Big Sam's Funky Nation (appearing in the circa 2004 edition), and Galactic-spinoff Good Enough for Good Times. As of August, Coogan has joined Pretty Lights to promote his new album, A Color Map of the Sun and plays keyboard for the new live band in the Analog Future Tour.

References

External links
 Brian Coogan's MySpace Music page
 Brian Coogan's Facebook page

1979 births
21st-century American keyboardists
21st-century American male musicians
American jazz keyboardists
American funk keyboardists
Jazz musicians from New Orleans
Living people
Musicians from Baton Rouge, Louisiana
The Coalition of the Willing (band) members